The Pawling Nature Reserve is located in the northern section of the Town of Pawling, New York, United States. It is a  area located along the top of Hammersby Ridge, near Quaker Lake owned and managed by The Nature Conservancy.

Acquired in 1958 from a local citizens' group, it is preserved to protect several diverse communities, including plant and animal species considered rare or threatened in New York, such as the devil's bit, soapwort gentian, maidenhair spleenwort and some salamander communities. It also helps protect the watershed of the Great Swamp to the east.

The preserve's main access is a large parking lot on Quaker Lake Road. In addition to the natural environments, the trails also offer scenic views of the Harlem Valley region.

References

External links
Pawling Nature Reserve Website
The Nature Conservancy: Pawling Nature Reserve
Map of the Pawling Nature Reserve

Nature reserves in New York (state)
Nature Conservancy preserves in New York (state)
Pawling, New York
Protected areas established in 1958
Protected areas of Dutchess County, New York